Mattia Carpanese born (5 November 1985 in Padova, Italy) is a former motorcycle speedway rider from Italy. He is six times National champion of Italy.

Career
Carpanese rode in the United Kingdom for the Workington Comets during the 2007 Premier League, and for the Birmingham Brummies in 2008.

Carpanese finished runner-up in the Italian Championship in 2005. He was selected as a wild card for the 2006 and 2007 Italian Speedway Grand Prix. He quit the Comets after a string of injuries on 30 August 2007.

On 20 April 2008 it was announced that Carpanese had been signed by Birmingham Brummies as a short term replacement for injured rider James Birkinshaw but was released after twenty eight days.

Speedway Grand Prix

Honours

World Championships
 Team World Championship (Speedway World Cup)
 2005 - 4th place in Qualifying round 2 (1 point)
 2006 - 4th place in Qualifying round 2 (7 points)
 2007 - 3rd place in Qualifying round 2 (12 points)
 2009 - 3rd place in Qualifying round 1 (9 points)
 2010 - 4th place in Qualifying round 2 (11 points)
 Individual U-21 World Championship
 2006 - 13th place (5 points)

European Championships
 Individual European Championship
 2007 - 12th place in Qualifying Round 1 (4 points)
 2008 Final will be on 2008-08-23 (track reserve)
 European Pairs Championship
 2004 - 7th place in Semi-Final 1 (1 point)
 2007 - 7th place (0 points)
 2009 - 3rd place in Semi-Final

See also
 Italy national speedway team
 List of Speedway Grand Prix riders

References and notes

1985 births
Living people
Italian speedway riders
Workington Comets riders